Binabəy (also, Benabay) is a village in the Astara Rayon of Azerbaijan.  The village forms part of the municipality of Siyaku.

References 

Populated places in Astara District